Centre Presbyterian Church, also known as Centre Church, is a historic Presbyterian church at Main (state highway NY 23) and Church streets in Windham, Greene County, New York.  It was built in 1835 and is a New England style frame church with elements of Federal and Greek Revival design.  It features a pedimented grant portico supported by paired Ionic order columns and a three-stage bell tower.

It was added to the National Register of Historic Places in 1979. After being closed for several years, the church was donated to the town of Windham in the 1970s for use as a civic centre. The building underwent extensive renovations in the 1990s and is home to the Windham Music Festival.

References

Presbyterian churches in New York (state)
Churches on the National Register of Historic Places in New York (state)
Federal architecture in New York (state)
Churches completed in 1835
19th-century Presbyterian church buildings in the United States
Churches in Greene County, New York
National Register of Historic Places in Greene County, New York